Shadow Zone is the ninth studio album released by the heavy metal guitarist Axel Rudi Pell, as well as the second album released by the current line-up.  The album was released in 2002 by SPV.

Track listing
All songs by Axel Rudi Pell.
 "The Curse of the Chains" (Intro) - 1:26
 "Edge of the World" - 5:19 
 "Coming Home" - 7:04
 "Live for the King" - 8:15
 "All the Rest of My Life" - 8:05
 "Follow the Sign" - 4:29
 "Time of the Truth" - 8:20
 "Heartbreaker" - 6:43
 "Saint of Fools" - 5:00
 "Under the Gun" - 6:48

Personnel
Axel Rudi Pell - electric guitar
Johnny Gioeli - vocals
Ferdy Doernberg - keyboards
Volker Krawczak - bass guitar
Mike Terrana - drums

References

External links
Shadow Zone at Axel Rudi Pell.de

2002 albums
Axel Rudi Pell albums
SPV/Steamhammer albums